Hans "Bubi" Rohde (7 December 1914 – 3 December 1979) was a German footballer.

The Defender and midfielder earned 25 caps for Germany from 1936 to 1942. His team was Eimsbütteler TV of Hamburg.

External links

References

1914 births
1979 deaths
German footballers
Germany international footballers
Eimsbütteler TV players
Association football midfielders
German footballers needing infoboxes
Footballers from Hamburg